Holy Trinity Anglican Church  is a historic Carpenter Gothic style Anglican church building located on the banks of the Churchill River in Stanley Mission, a community in the Lac La Ronge First Nation and Lac La Ronge Provincial Park in Saskatchewan, Canada.

History
Designed by the Rev. Robert Hunt, an English missionary who founded Stanley Mission in 1851 with the permission of the Hudson's Bay Company, it was built between 1854 and 1860 by local Cree craftsmen using locally cut lumber as well as hardware and stained glass that Hunt had brought from England. The church was at one time the centre of an active missionary complex that included nearly 30 supporting buildings and a 
cemetery. It is currently the oldest standing building in Saskatchewan. Although not the seat of a bishop, it has been called a cathedral because of its massive size with a tall central nave and elaborate spire.

Holy Trinity Anglican Church was designated a National Historic Site of Canada in 1970. It is also a provincially registered historic site as designated by the government of Saskatchewan on August 26, 1981. A ceremony celebrating the church's 150th anniversary was held on June 10, 2010.

References

External links
 Stanley Mission Church
 Historical Sketch of the Diocese of Saskatchewan
 Lac La Ronge Provincial Park

Anglican church buildings in Saskatchewan
Carpenter Gothic church buildings in Saskatchewan
Heritage sites in Saskatchewan
National Historic Sites in Saskatchewan
Churches completed in 1860
19th-century Anglican church buildings in Canada
Churches on the National Historic Sites of Canada register